Samuel Birrell is a member of the Australian House of Representatives for the division of Nicholls in northern Victoria and a member of the National Party. In the 2022 Australian federal election, Birrell won a race between a Liberal Party candidate and independent candidate Rob Priestly.

Early life
Birrell grew up on a property on Victoria's Goulburn River between the towns of Murchison and Toolamba. His father was a lawyer and his mother was a schoolteacher. He attended Shepparton High School for two years then completed his secondary education as a boarder at Assumption College, Kilmore. After leaving high school, Birrell worked on a farm in Ardmona for two years before completing a degree in agricultural science at the University of Melbourne's Dookie campus. He later completed an MBA at La Trobe University's Shepparton campus in 2017.

Career
After graduating university, Birrell worked as an agronomist for a rural supplies business, specialising in pest identification and soil and leaf analysis. He later worked for irrigation supplier Netafim.

Birrell was appointed CEO of the Committee for Greater Shepparton in 2016. He resigned the position in 2021 to run for parliament.

Politics
In January 2022, Birrell won Nationals preselection for the seat of Nicholls at the 2022 federal election, following the retirement of incumbent Nationals MP Damian Drum. He retained Nicholls for the Nationals on a substantially reduced primary vote, with significant swings to the Liberal candidate Steve Brooks and independent candidate Rob Priestly.

Political views
Birrell supported a Designated Area Migration Agreement (DAMA) for the Goulburn Valley. In 2021 he appeared before a parliamentary inquiry into skilled migration, advocating for "an immediate global recruitment campaign to attract migrants with in-demand skills" to help fill job shortages in regional areas.

References 

National Party of Australia members of the Parliament of Australia
Members of the Australian House of Representatives
Members of the Australian House of Representatives for Nicholls
Living people
21st-century Australian politicians
Year of birth missing (living people)
University of Melbourne alumni
Australian agronomists
La Trobe University alumni